KJCN may refer to:

 KJCN (FM), a radio station (107.5 FM) licensed to serve Sutter Creek, California, United States
 KJCN-LP, a defunct low-power television station (channel 36) formerly licensed to serve Paso Robles, California